Wangnia Pongte (died 15 June 2013) was an Indian football player and politician.

He was the Arunachal Pradesh MLA for Changlang North assembly constituency in 1990. He served as MoS (Independent charge) for Research, Library, Labour and Agriculture. He was re-elected in 2004. He was Chairman of Arunachal Pradesh Mineral Development Trading Corporation. He died on 15 June 2013. He had two wives, three daughters and two sons. Pongte was the first Tutsa elected to Arunachal Pradesh Legislative Assembly and often regarded as the Father of Tutsa community.

Death
Pongte died in a traffic collision on 15 June 2013. He is survived by wife, two sons and two daughters.

References

2013 deaths
Indian footballers
Year of birth missing
People from Changlang
State cabinet ministers of Arunachal Pradesh
Indian National Congress politicians
Indian sportsperson-politicians
Footballers from Arunachal Pradesh
Road incident deaths in India
Association footballers not categorized by position
Naga people
Arunachal Pradesh MLAs 1990–1995
Arunachal Pradesh MLAs 2004–2009